The House is a 2022 British animation stop-motion animated anthology film written by Enda Walsh and telling different stories forming a trilogy spanning different worlds and characters but set inside the same house. Each story deals with themes of madness, wealth, and the pursuit of true happiness.

Originally announced as a television miniseries, it became an anthology film. Produced for Netflix by Nexus Studios in London, it tells three stories respectively directed by the duo of Emma de Swaef and Marc James Roels, Niki Lindroth von Bahr, and Paloma Baeza in their directorial debuts; the directors are credited with the story of their respective segments, with Johannes Nyholm as co-writer for the second.

Plot 
=== I – And heard within, a lie is spun ===
A young girl named Mabel lives with her father Raymond, mother Penny, and newborn sister Isobel in relative poverty. After a visit from wealthy, condescending relatives, Raymond wanders drunk into the forest at night and encounters the mysterious architect Mr. Van Schoonbeek. The following morning, Van Schoonbeek’s employee Mr. Thomas visits the family and convinces Raymond and Penny to accept Van Schoonbeek's offer to move into a new luxurious house built for them at no charge.

After the family moves in, Mabel notices several peculiar things about the house and the workers constantly refitting it, but her parents are mesmerized by the house and its luxuries. Raymond becomes increasingly obsessed with the house's fireplace, which he constantly fails to light up, while Penny spends more and more time sewing drapes. Mabel becomes further put off when her parents don attire designed by Van Schoonbeek which resembles the furniture they adore (a chair and curtains).

Exploring the house one night, Mabel and Isobel find themselves lost in the maze it has become, eventually stumbling upon Thomas. Drunk and ashamed, Thomas confesses that he is an actor following a script provided by Van Schoonbeek. Meanwhile, Raymond is finally able to light a fire by burning the family's old possessions, including his father’s chair and Mabel's dollhouse. When the sisters finally reunite with their parents, they find Raymond and Penny turned into furniture—Raymond into a chair and Penny into curtains. As the fire expands, the parents urge their daughters to escape. Using the curtains to climb out a window while their parents burn alive, Mabel and Isobel escape before watching the smoking house from a distance as the sun rises.

II – Then lost is truth that can't be won 
The story is set in a world populated by anthropomorphic rats, and the house is now settled in a developed city street and about to go up for sale. The developer renovating the house recently laid off his entire construction crew to reduce costs and must do all the work himself. Discovering the house has been infested by fur beetles and larvae, he uses copious amounts of boric acid to get rid of them, to no avail.

On the day of the viewing, the guests are unimpressed by the house, but a strangely proportioned couple remains, expressing a strong interest in buying the house. Unwilling to risk the sale, the developer lets them stay the night. Over the next few days, the odd couple remain firmly settled in the house, the bugs return in force, and the bank keeps demanding repayment of the developer's business loan. The developer decides to stop indulging the couple, only for many members of their family to show up wanting to enter the house.

At his wit's end, the developer tries to use the boric acid on the couple, but he inhales a mouthful and faints. He survives but is reduced to a catatonic state. The couple picks the developer up from the hospital and brings him home, where their family welcomes him back, many of them now sporting additional limbs. The final scene shows the family ravaging the inside of the house—climbing up the walls and chewing through everything. The developer, having regressed to animal-like intelligence, briefly emerges from the remains of the oven to eat garbage before retreating underground.

III – Listen again and seek the sun 
In a world that suffered an apocalyptic flood and is populated by anthropomorphic cats, the house is surrounded by water which keeps rising. Rosa, the landlord who cherishes the memories of her days growing up in the house, dreams of restoring it to its former glory. However, she struggles financially; and her only tenants, fisherman Elias and hippie Jen, do not pay rent despite her insistence; she consistently ignores their attempts to address the rising water.

When Jen's "spirit partner" Cosmos (a craftsman) arrives to visit, Rosa enlists him to work on the house; but is infuriated to find out he has instead been tearing up the house's floorboards to build a boat for Elias. As Cosmos continues to refit the house against Rosa's wishes, Rosa argues with Elias; hurt that he wishes to leave, while he accuses her of being afraid to do the same. He later departs on the makeshift boat.

As the water and mist continue to seep into the house and Jen prepares to leave the house with Cosmos, she puts Rosa into a dream-like trance, in which Rosa sees the house destroyed and her friends abandoning her. Emerging from the vision, she sees Jen and Cosmos sailing away, calling for her to join them; but the boat is too far away. Remembering a large lever Cosmos had built, she pushes it, transforming the house into a seaworthy vessel. Encouraged by Jen, Cosmos, and a returning Elias, Rosa takes control of the house ship, escaping as the floods destroy the surrounding foundations, and the four sail out into the ocean.

Voice cast 
 I – And heard within, a lie is spun
 Mia Goth as Mabel
 Claudie Blakley as Penelope
 Matthew Goode as Raymond
 Mark Heap as Mr. Thomas
 Miranda Richardson as Aunt Clarice
 Josh McGuire as Uncle Georgie
 Stephanie Cole as Great Aunt Eleanor
 Barney Pilling as Mr. Van Schoonbeek

 II – Then lost is truth that can't be won
 Jarvis Cocker as the Developer
 Yvonne Lombard as the Odd Wife
 Sven Wollter as the Odd Husband. This was Wollter’s final role prior to his death.
 Bimini Bon-Boulash as Police Officer #1
 Ayesha Antoine as Police Officer #2

 III – Listen again and seek the sun
 Susan Wokoma as Rosa 
 Helena Bonham Carter as Jen
 Paul Kaye as Cosmos
 Will Sharpe as Elias

Production 
The House was first announced in January 2020, with the anthology being produced at the London unit of Nexus Studios for Netflix. Nexus had three director teams lined up to tell a tale of three distinct family generations at the same house:  The duo of Emma de Swaef and Marc James Roels, Niki Lindroth von Bahr, and Paloma Baeza; the directors are credited for the story of their respective segments, with Johannes Nyholm as co-writer for the second. At the 2021 Annecy Film Festival in June, the key voice cast was announced for each story. In November 2021, the first images of the anthology were revealed along with the release date of 14 January 2022. The first trailer was released in December 2021.

Nicolas Ménard and Manshen Lo co-created the hand-drawn, 2D animated title sequence.

The project had originated at a meeting at producer Charlotte Bavasso's London home, where the four directors "brainstormed a bit and came up with this idea about a house in which different things are happening in different times. We agreed that we would each have our own separate chapter, but still with connections to each other," according to von Bahr. Later, "We chatted a lot over Zoom and helped each other with script development and character design, everything. All of us were quite new to such an upscale project, so I think this was a perfect arrangement. You had your own film, but you didn't feel alone." Bavasso, said Baeza, "brought us together and we talked about stories and characters that we were interested in, and we tried to find overlaps, which is a completely unique experience. You never get to work with filmmakers or creatives in that collaborative way where you are each doing a separate film, but also sharing lots of ideas." The directors wrote detailed story outlines, and then Irish playwright Enda Walsh wrote all three segments' dialog in collaboration with them.

Roels said his and Swaef's opening segment came from the desire to tell "the story of the house before there was a house, the origin story, so to speak. I had been reading a graphic novel by Richard McGuire called Here, in which you see a corner of the world and how it changes through millennia. You see it as farmland, and when it was inhabited by Native Americans, and before that when there were dinosaurs. And then suddenly you're in the 1950s and someone's vacuuming the floor. And it kind of sparked off an idea, like what was there before the house?"

Each of the three segments required more than 20 weeks to produce. Except for the Busby Berkeley style dance number in the second segment and the mist and some water effects in the third segment, almost all the animation was done "in camera" without greenscreen or digital compositing. Jarvis Cocker wrote and performed the song that plays over the closing credits.

Reception 
 

Dmitry Samarov of the Chicago Reader said the movie "sustains its momentum by varying the styles of storytelling and rarely stooping to either crassness or cutesiness. ... Each story is directed by different people with obviously separate ideas and inspirations; this heterogeneity moves the film along without ever letting it overstay its welcome. Yet the unifying elements of setting and the charmingly old-fashioned stop-motion animation keep it from flying off in a million directions."

Lucy Mangan in The Guardian gave the movie 3 out of 5 stars. She said the first segment is "by far the most successful of the trio," and that the second was "too underbaked to deliver any real horrors or work as a fable about violation, or capitalism or any of the other themes it seems at various moments to be nodding vaguely at." She said the third was "a very, very slight affair," and that overall, "If the content of the stories had matched the painstaking form, the anthology could have been rather a groundbreaking success." But Noel Murray of The A.V. Club said of that second segment that, "All of The House is worth watching—especially for animation buffs—but for those who can handle a hefty helping of grotesquerie, von Bahr's segment is the one can't-miss."

Nick Allen at RogerEbert.com said, "With its rising directors each employing a surreal style, it creates a rich balance of ethereal, existential storytelling with stop-motion animation that's so detailed and alive you can practically feel it on your fingertips", and that it "proves to be a consistent anthology, in that it's always just about the same level of surreal, playful, sadistic, and entertaining".

Accolades

References

External links 
 
 
The House official site (Nexus Studios)

Animated anthology films
Stop-motion animated films
2020s British animated films
2020s stop-motion animated films
2022 animated films
2022 films
Animation anthology series
Animated films about cats
Animated films about rats
Animated films set in the future
English-language Netflix original films
Films scored by Gustavo Santaolalla
Films set in country houses
Films set in the future
Films set in the 1800s
Netflix Animation films
2020s English-language films
British adult animated films
Trilogies
2020s American films
2020s British films